Kevin Smith (1953–2005) was an actor who worked for with the Belvoir Theatre Company in Sydney   playing roles in Shakespeare and modern works. He was also known as the narrator of Dreamtime animations and the storyteller of Dreamtime stories on Australian TV. He  narrated the stage version of Tim Winton's Cloudstreet that toured Australia.

He played many support roles on TV and in film. His last performance on film was in the Ray Lawrence film Jindabyne, in which he played the bereaved father of the dead girl.

1953 births
2005 deaths
Australian male television actors
Australian male film actors
Australian male stage actors